The Adventures of Juan Quin Quin is a 1967 Cuban comedy film directed by Julio García Espinosa. It was entered into the 5th Moscow International Film Festival.

Cast
 Júlio Martínez as Juan Quin Quin
 Erdwin Fernández as Jachero
 Adelaida Raymat as Teresa
 Enrique Santiesteban as Der Feind
 Agustín Campos
 Blanca Contreras

See also 
 List of Cuban films

References

External links
 

1967 films
1967 comedy films
1960s Spanish-language films
Cuban black-and-white films
Cuban comedy films